The 2014 Open GDF Suez de Limoges was a professional tennis tournament played on indoor hard courts. It was the eighth edition of the tournament which was part of the 2014 WTA 125K series, offering a total of $125,000 in prize money. It took place in Limoges, France, on 3–9 November 2014.

Singles entrants

Seeds 

 1 Rankings as of 27 October 2014

Other entrants 
The following players received wildcards into the singles main draw:
  Océane Dodin
  Caroline Garcia
  Amandine Hesse
  Virginie Razzano

The following players received entry from the qualifying draw:
  Gioia Barbieri
  Darya Kasatkina
  Katarzyna Piter
  Urszula Radwańska

The following player received entry into the singles main draw as a lucky loser:
  Richèl Hogenkamp

Withdrawals 
Before the tournament
  Alizé Cornet (lumbar spine pain and replaced by Richèl Hogenkamp)
  Aleksandra Krunić (replaced by Kateřina Siniaková)
  Johanna Larsson (replaced by Andreea Mitu)
  Tamira Paszek (replaced by Maryna Zanevska)
  Kristýna Plíšková (replaced by Kristína Kučová)

Doubles entrants

Seeds

Champions

Singles 

  Tereza Smitková def.  Kristina Mladenovic 7–6(7–4), 7–5

Doubles 

  Kateřina Siniaková /  Renata Voráčová def.  Tímea Babos /  Kristina Mladenovic 2–6, 6–2, [10–5]

External links 

 2014 Open GDF Suez de Limoges at wtatennis.com
 Official website 

2014 WTA 125K series
2014 in French tennis
Open de Limoges